Chataignier is a village in Evangeline Parish, Louisiana, United States. The population was 364 at the 2010 census.

Geography
Chataignier is located at  (30.570834, -92.319089).

History
The name Chataignier is French and means "chinquapin," a small chestnut. Chinquapins (Castanea pumila) grew abundantly in the surrounding prairie until the chestnut blight wiped them out. They are now non-existent in the Chataignier community.

Gleanings from old records indicate that Chataignier's first settler was Ursiana Manuel who came from Mexico via New Orleans circa 1793 when Louisiana was a Spanish colony and George Washington was serving as President of the new republic known as the United States of America. The descendants of Ursiana Manuel are still living on the original land grant obtained by him during the Spanish domination of Louisiana. Other early settlers mentioned are Jacques Fontenot, Louis Redan, General Garis de Flaugeac, Artemon Lafleur, and Valentine Savoy. Savoy, incidentally, was the first man to begin the manufacture of spinning wheels in this part of the country. He also operated a large plantation, a cotton gin and a saw mill.

The settlers of Chataignier have long enjoyed the benefits of religion (predominantly Catholic), education and postal service, in that order. The second oldest church in the Evangeline country was founded in Chataignier. Records show that it was first a mission of Opelousas beginning in 1856 but that in 1869 it was created as a separate parish called Our Lady of Mount Carmel. A church was built with Father Jean Baptiste Bre as its first pastor. In 1901, the then pastor Father A. L. Bacchioci moved to the new nearby village of Eunice, of which Chataignier became a mission at that time. The following year, Chataignier became an established church and separate parish for the second time and has remained so to this day.

The Chataignier community's educational background dates back to the pre-Civil War year of 1858 when the first known school, the Onezine Lafleur School, was located in the upper Chataignier community. Although the name of the teacher prior to the Civil War is not known, it has been established that Dorsin Lafleur was appointed teacher for a short period of time during the war. The war itself eventually brought about the close of the school; however, in 1879, Mrs. P. H. Marueney was appointed to teach and the school reopened. At this time, French was the language used and taught in school. Progress continued and by 1887 Chataignier had one of the eight public schools in the parish.

The Chataignier post office was established on November 20, 1879 in what was known at that time as St. Landry Parish. In 1910, the very large area of St. Landry Parish was divided up to form several other parishes, one of which was Evangeline. Chataignier now occupies the southeastern part of that parish. The Village of Chataignier was incorporated in January, 1973 with a population of 375. Old historical spots have long disappeared and all that remains are parish lines, township lines, and section lines (all used in land surveys). The economy of the area is agriculturally based.

Demographics

2020 census

As of the 2020 United States census, there were 259 people, 142 households, and 71 families residing in the village.

2000 census
As of the census of 2000, there were 383 people, 132 households, and 107 families residing in the village. The racial makeup of the village was 50.91% White, 47.78% African American, 0.26% from other races, and 1.04% from two or more races. Hispanic or Latino of any race were 0.52% of the population.

There were 132 households, out of which 43.2% had children under the age of 18 living with them, 45.5% were married couples living together, 25.0% had a female householder with no husband present, and 18.9% were non-families. 18.9% of all households were made up of individuals, and 4.5% had someone living alone who was 65 years of age or older. The average household size was 2.90 and the average family size was 3.28.

In the village, the population was spread out, with 35.0% under the age of 18, 10.7% from 18 to 24, 27.2% from 25 to 44, 18.0% from 45 to 64, and 9.1% who were 65 years of age or older. The median age was 29 years. For every 100 females, there were 102.6 males. For every 100 females age 18 and over, there were 93.0 males.

The median income for a household in the village was $18,438, and the median income for a family was $18,269. Males had a median income of $21,250 versus $18,750 for females. The per capita income for the village was $7,266. About 46.4% of families and 49.4% of the population were below the poverty line, including 66.1% of those under age 18 and 12.8% of those age 65 or over.

Education
Public schools in Evangeline Parish are operated by the Evangeline Parish School Board. Chataignier Elementary School is located in the village of Chataignier and serves students in grades pre-kindergarten through eight.

References

Villages in Evangeline Parish, Louisiana
Villages in Louisiana
Populated places established in 1856